The City of Monte Vista is the home rule municipality that is the most populous municipality in Rio Grande County, Colorado, United States.  The city population was 4,245 at the 2020 Census.

History
Monte Vista was laid out in 1884. The site had previously served as a watering stop for the Denver and Rio Grande Western Railroad. Monte Vista is the Spanish translation of "mountain view."

Geography
Monte Vista is located in the San Luis Valley at  (37.577287, -106.145828).

Demographics

As of the 2000 census, there were 4,529 people, 1,715 households, and 1,212 families residing in the city. The racial makeup of the city was 63.08% White, 0.38% African American, 1.61% Native American, 0.29% Asian, 0.04% Pacific Islander, 31.82% from other races, and 2.78% from two or more races. Hispanic or Latino people of any race were 58.20% of the population.

There were 1,715 households, out of which 36.8% had children under the age of 18 living with them, 50.1% were married couples living together, 15.9% had a female householder with no husband present, and 29.3% were non-families. 25.9% of all households were made up of individuals, and 11.8% had someone living alone who was 65 years of age or older. The average household size was 2.59, and the average family size was 3.13.

In the city, the population was spread out, with 29.6% under the age of 18, 9.2% from 18 to 24, 26.1% from 25 to 44, 20.5% from 45 to 64, and 14.6% who were 65 years of age or older. The median age was 34 years. For every 100 females, there were 90.7 males. For every 100 females age 18 and over, there were 85.3 males.

The median income for a household in the city was $28,392, and the median income for a family was $33,780. Males had a median income of $29,057 versus $23,482 for females. The per capita income for the city was $13,612.

Culture
Monte Vista is served by the Carnegie Public Library.

Every March, nearly 20,000 Sandhill Cranes descend on the San Luis Valley before continuing their northward spring migration.

See also

 List of municipalities in Colorado
 San Luis Valley

References

External links

 
 Monte Vista Journal
 CDOT map of the City of Monte Vista
 SLV Dweller - Since 2002, SLV Dweller has served as an agglomeration of San Luis Valley news and information from varied sources.

Cities in Rio Grande County, Colorado
Cities in Colorado